Rolf Erik Sören Edling (born 30 November 1943) is a retired Swedish épée fencer. He competed at the 1968, 1972, 1976 and 1980 Olympics and won a team gold medal in 1976. His best individual result was fourth place in 1980.

Edling was born in India,  where his father was worked for the ASEA company. He then moved to Sweden and started fencing at a boarding school in Sigtuna. Between 1969 and 1978 he won ten medals at the world championships, including five gold medals. In 1973 he was awarded the Svenska Dagbladet Gold Medal.

Awards
   Swedish Fencing Federation Royal Medal of Merit in gold (Svenska fäktförbundets kungliga förtjänstmedalj i guld) (2012)

References

1943 births
Living people
Sportspeople from Mumbai
Swedish male épée fencers
Olympic fencers of Sweden
Fencers at the 1968 Summer Olympics
Fencers at the 1972 Summer Olympics
Fencers at the 1976 Summer Olympics
Fencers at the 1980 Summer Olympics
Olympic gold medalists for Sweden
Olympic medalists in fencing
Medalists at the 1976 Summer Olympics